David Alexander Bokee (October 6, 1805 – March 15, 1860) was an American lawyer, merchant and politician from New York.

Biography
Born in New York City, Bokee was the son of Frederick and Rachel McKenzie Bokee and attended the public schools. He then engaged in mercantile pursuits while he studied law. He was admitted to the bar, and practiced law. Later he was also a shipping merchant. He married Sarah Ann Dowdny and they had six children, Helena, Frederick, Margaret, Joseph, David, and William.

Career
Bokee was President of the Brooklyn Board of Aldermen from 1840 to 1843; and again from 1845 to 1848. He was a member of the New York State Senate (2nd D.) in 1848 and 1849. He was also a Trustee of the New York Life Insurance Company from 1848 to 1860.

He was elected as a Whig to the 31st United States Congress, holding office from March 4, 1849, to March 3, 1851. Bokee was appointed by President Millard Fillmore as Naval Officer of the Port of New York, and remained in office from 1851 to 1853.

Bokee died on March 15, 1860, in Washington, D.C.; and was buried at the Green-Wood Cemetery in Brooklyn.

References

External links

1805 births
1860 deaths
Politicians from Brooklyn
New York (state) state senators
Burials at Green-Wood Cemetery
New York (state) city council members
Whig Party members of the United States House of Representatives from New York (state)
19th-century American politicians